The 2021 Sparks 300 was a NASCAR Xfinity Series race  held on October 2, 2021, at Talladega Superspeedway in Lincoln, Alabama. Contested over 107- shortened from 113 laps due to an overtime finish—laps on the  asphalt superspeedway, it was the 28th race of the 2021 NASCAR Xfinity Series season, the second race of the Playoffs, and the second race of the Round of 12. After "The Big One" occurred late, Brandon Brown was determined as the leader at the time of caution. The race was then called due to darkness, leading to his first career Xfinity series victory.

After the race, Brown unwittingly became associated with politics when NBC Sports reporter Kelli Stavast's misstating of a crowd chant led to "Let's Go Brandon" becoming a political slogan used against U.S. President Joe Biden.

Report

Background
Talladega Superspeedway, originally known as Alabama International Motor Superspeedway (AIMS), is a motorsports complex located north of Talladega, Alabama. It is located on the former Anniston Air Force Base in the small city of Lincoln. The track is a tri-oval and was constructed in the 1960s by the International Speedway Corporation, a business controlled by the France family. Talladega is most known for its steep banking and the unique location of the start/finish line that's located just past the exit to pit road. The track currently hosts the NASCAR series such as the NASCAR Cup Series, Xfinity Series and the Camping World Truck Series. Talladega is the longest NASCAR oval with a length of  tri-oval like the Daytona International Speedway, which also is a  tri-oval.

Entry list 

 (R) denotes rookie driver.
 (i) denotes driver who is ineligible for series driver points.

Qualifying
Justin Allgaier was awarded the pole for the race as determined by competition-based formula. Timmy Hill did not have enough points to qualify for the race.

Starting lineup

Race

Race results

Stage Results 
Stage One
Laps: 25

Stage Two
Laps: 25

Final Stage Results 

Laps:

Race statistics 

 Lead changes: 33 among 17 different drivers
 Cautions/Laps: 5 for 21
 Time of race: 2 hours, 4 minutes, and 55 seconds
 Average speed:

References 

NASCAR races at Talladega Superspeedway
2021 in sports in Alabama
Sparks 300
2021 NASCAR Xfinity Series